This is a list of endangered flora of the Esperance Plains region, a biogeographic region in southern Western Australia. It includes all taxa that occur in the region, and that have been classified as "R: Declared Rare Flora - Extant Taxa" or "X: Declared Rare Flora - Presumed Extinct Taxa" under the Department of Environment and Conservation's Declared Rare and Priority Flora List, and are hence gazetted as endangered extant flora under the Wildlife Conservation Act 1950.

There are 72 endangered taxa. Acacia prismifolia is presumed extinct. The other 71 are believed extant:
 Acacia awestoniana
 Acacia rhamphophylla
 Acacia trulliformis
 Adenanthos dobagii (Fitzgerald Woollybush)
 Adenanthos ellipticus (Oval-leaf Adenanthos)
 Adenanthos pungens subsp. pungens
 Adenanthos velutinus (Velvet Woollybush)
 Andersonia axilliflora (Giant Andersonia)
 Anigozanthos bicolor subsp. minor
 Banksia anatona
 Banksia brownii (Feather-leaved Banksia)
 Banksia montana
 Banksia pseudoplumosa
 Banksia verticillata (Albany Banksia)
 Beyeria sp. Bandalup Hill
 Boronia clavata
 Caladenia bryceana subsp. bryceana
 Chamelaucium sp. Hamersley
 Chordifex abortivus
 Conostylis lepidospermoides (Sedge Conostylis)
 Conostylis misera (Grass Conostylis)
 Coopernookia georgei (Mauve Coopernookia)
 Darwinia carnea (Mogumber Bell)
 Darwinia collina (Yellow Mountain Bell)
 Darwinia meeboldii (Cranbrook Bell)
 Darwinia oxylepis (Gilliam's Bell)
 Darwinia sp. Stirling Range
 Darwinia squarrosa (Pink Mountain Bell)
 Darwinia wittwerorum
 Daviesia glossosema
 Daviesia megacalyx
 Daviesia obovata
 Daviesia pseudaphylla
 Deyeuxia drummondii (Drummond Grass)
 Drakaea confluens ms
 Dryandra ionthocarpa subsp. ionthocarpa
 Eremophila ciliata (Archer's Eremophila)
 Eremophila denticulata subsp. denticulata ms
 Eremophila subteretifolia ms
 Eucalyptus burdettiana (Burdett Gum)
 Eucalyptus coronata (Crowned Mallee)
 Eucalyptus insularis (Twin Peak Island Mallee)
 Eucalyptus merrickiae (Goblet Mallee)
 Eucalyptus purpurata
 Eucalyptus steedmanii (Steedman's Gum)

 Gastrolobium luteifolium
 Grevillea infundibularis (Fan-leaf Grevillea)
 Grevillea maxwellii
 Hibbertia priceana
 Kunzea similis
 Lambertia echinata subsp. echinata
 Latrobea obovata ms
 Isopogon uncinatus
 Lambertia fairallii (Fairall's Honeysuckle)
 Lepidium aschersonii (Spiny Peppercress)
 Leucopogon gnaphalioides
 Marianthus mollis (Hairy-fruited Billardiera)
 Myoporum cordifolium
 Orthrosanthus muelleri
 Persoonia micranthera (Small-flowered Snottygobble)
 Rhizanthella gardneri (Underground Orchid)
 Ricinocarpos trichophorus
 Scaevola macrophylla
 Sphenotoma drummondii (Mountain Paper-heath)
 Stachystemon vinosus
 Stylidium galioides (Yellow Mountain Triggerplant)
 Thelymitra psammophila (Sandplain Sun Orchid)
 Verticordia carinata
 Verticordia crebra
 Verticordia helichrysantha (Barrens Featherflower)
 Verticordia pityrhops
 Xyris exilis

References

 
Lists of plants of Australia
Nature conservation in Western Australia
Esperance Plains
 Esperance Plains
Lists of biota of Western Australia